Nasir Jamal (born 21 December 1993) is an Afghan cricketer. He made his international debut for the Afghanistan cricket team in July 2014.

Career
He made his One Day International debut for Afghanistan against Zimbabwe in July 2014. He made his Twenty20 debut for Mis Ainak Knights in the 2017 Shpageeza Cricket League on 12 September 2017.

In September 2018, he was named in Kandahar's squad in the first edition of the Afghanistan Premier League tournament.

In December 2018, he was named in Afghanistan's under-23 team for the 2018 ACC Emerging Teams Asia Cup.

Test cricket
In May 2018, he was named in Afghanistan's squad for their inaugural Test match, played against India, but he was not selected for the match. In February 2019, he was named in Afghanistan's Test squad for their one-off match against Ireland in India, but he did not play. In November 2019, he was again named in Afghanistan's Test squad, this time for the one-off match against the West Indies. He made his Test debut for Afghanistan, against the West Indies, on 27 November 2019.

References

External links
 

1993 births
Living people
Afghan cricketers
Afghanistan Test cricketers
Afghanistan One Day International cricketers
Place of birth missing (living people)
Cricketers at the 2015 Cricket World Cup
Band-e-Amir Dragons cricketers
Kandahar Knights cricketers